The 2019 Lahore bombing was a suicide bomb attack that occurred on the morning of 8 May 2019 outside Data Darbar in Lahore, Pakistan. It killed at least 13 people (including five policemen) and injured at least 24 others. CCTV footage of the blast showed the bomber targeted an Elite Police mobile parked outside the shrine. Hizbul Ahrar - a splinter group of Jamaat-ul-Ahrar and Tehrik-i-Taliban Pakistan - claimed responsibility for the attack. On 9 May 2019, security forces arrested four suspects during a raid in Lahore's Garhi Shahu area. On 10 May 2019, the provincial government formed a joint investigation team (JIT) to probe the incident.

See also
 July 2010 Lahore bombings
 List of terrorist incidents in May 2019
 Terrorist incidents in Lahore since 2000

References

2019 in Punjab, Pakistan
2019 murders in Pakistan
2019 bombing
21st-century mass murder in Pakistan 
2019 bombing
Islamic terrorist incidents in 2019
Mass murder in 2019
2019 bombing
May 2019 crimes in Asia
May 2019 events in Pakistan
Suicide bombings in 2019
2019 
Terrorist incidents in Pakistan in 2019